Daria Tarasova (born 6 July 1988) is a former competitive wushu taolu athlete and coach from Russia. She is the most renowned Russian wushu athlete of all time.

Career 
Tarasaova made her international debut at the 2003 World Wushu Championships where she became the world champion in women's gunshu.

Tarasova's gold medal in the women's changquan event at the 2007 World Wushu Championships qualified her for the 2008 Beijing Wushu Tournament, where she also won in the same event. Shortly after, Tarasova was awarded the "Golden Belt" award by the Russian Martial Arts Federation. A year later, she won gold once again in the women's changquan event at the 2009 World Games where wushu was an invitational sport. She also won a bronze and silver medal at the 2009 World Wushu Championships. Tarasova also competed in the 2010 World Combat Games. The following year, she won another silver and bronze medal at the 2011 World Wushu Championships.

In 2012, Tarasova was appointed as the ambassador of wushu from the International Wushu Federation to the International Olympic Committee. Ahead of the 2013 World Combat Games, Tarasova was again appointed as the ambassador of wushu and promoted the sport throughout St. Petersburg. At the competition, Tarasova won the female changquan, jianshu, and qiangshu combined event despite never specializing in both weapons. A year later, she was invited to demonstrate at the Nanjing Sports Lab, a promotional event for non-Olympic sports, which took place alongside the 2014 Summer Youth Olympics. Her last competition was at the 2015 World Wushu Championships where she won a silver medal in gunshu and a bronze medal in shuangjian. She ended her career while also having been a nineteen-time champion at the European Wushu Championships.

In 2013, Tarasova became a member of the IWUF's athlete committee and in 2021, was elected to be the committee's chairman and an executive board member of the IWUF. Today, she is a coach of the Russian Wushu Team.

Tarasova holds the rank of "4th duan" by the Chinese Wushu Association.

References 

1986 births
Living people
Russian martial artists
Russian wushu practitioners
Sportspeople from Moscow
World Games gold medalists
Competitors at the 2008 Beijing Wushu Tournament
Competitors at the 2009 World Games
World Games medalists in wushu